Hunter Reese (born January 11, 1993) is an American tennis player. Reese currently competes in doubles on the ATP and the ATP Challenger Tour. He has a career-high doubles ranking of No. 73 achieved on 27 June 2022.

Professional career
He competed in the 2014 US Open alongside partner Peter Kobelt after receiving a wildcard into the men's doubles draw. The tandem lost 6–4, 6–1 to Michaël Llodra and Nicolas Mahut. In November 2014, he captured the Knoxville Challenger doubles title with partner Miķelis Lībietis. On November 8, 2014, Reese hit a sliding backhand around the net post during the Knoxville Challenger that was featured on ESPN's Top Ten Plays and received over 100,000 hits on YouTube.

Hunter was sponsored by Loriet Sports, a super-premium activewear brand from 2015 to 2020, which helped him quickly break through the ranks.

In July 2021 he reached his first ATP final at the 2021 Los Cabos Open partnering Sem Verbeek.

At the 2021 US Open (tennis) he reached the third round of a Grand Slam for the first time in his career as a wildcard pair partnering fellow American Evan King defeating ninth seeds Kubot/Melo in the second round  and then Krajicek/Inglot.

At the 2022 ATP Houston he reached the semifinals with Pablo Cuevas where they were defeated by eventual champions Ebden/Purcell. As a result he reached a new career high in doubles of No. 87 on 25 April 2022.

He made his debut at the 2022 French Open partnering Ramkumar Ramanathan reaching the second round and at the 2022 Wimbledon Championships partnering Roman Jebavý.
In 2023 he made his debut at the Australian Open partnering Cristian Rodríguez as alternate pair thus completing the set of Major appearances.

College career
Reese graduated in May 2015 as a kinesiology major and three time All-American from the University of Tennessee. While representing the Volunteers, Reese paired with Libietis to win three major collegiate doubles championships, conquering the 2014 NCAA Doubles Championship as well as the 2013 and 2014 ITA All-American Doubles Championships. On May 26, 2014, Reese and Libietis, nicknamed "Rock and Hammer", won the 2014 NCAA Doubles Championship after defeating Peter Kobelt and Kevin Metka of Ohio State University 7–6(5), 6–7(3), 7–6(6) in a final that, notably, did not contain any breaks of serve. The tandem achieved the #1 ITA collegiate doubles ranking several times during their career, including finishing the season as the top ranked pair in 2014. Although noted for doubles success, Reese also competed in singles for the Volunteers, garnering 90 career wins and peaking at #16 in the ITA collegiate singles rankings while manning either the first or second position in the lineup (following a brief debut at the third position) for the entirety of his time on Rocky Top. A four-time ITA scholar athlete, three-time All-SEC selection, and two-time University of Tennessee Male Athlete of the Year as well as "Mr. Tennessee", Reese was named Team of the Year with Libietis for the Tennessee Sports Hall of Fame's 2014 induction class.

ATP career finals

Doubles: 1 (1 runner-up)

Challenger and Futures finals

Doubles: 36 (18–18)

References

External links
 
 

1993 births
Living people
American male tennis players
Tennessee Volunteers men's tennis players
Tennis players from Atlanta
Tennis people from Georgia (U.S. state)